The 1974 Northern Iowa Panthers football team represented the University of Northern Iowa  as a member of the North Central Conference (NCC) during the 1974 NCAA Division II football season. Led by 15th-year head coach Stan Sheriff, the Panthers compiled an overall record of 5–4–1 with a mark of 3–3–1 in conference play, placing fifth in the NCC. Northern Iowa played home games at O. R. Latham Stadium in Cedar Falls, Iowa.

Schedule

References 

Northern Iowa
Northern Iowa Panthers football seasons
Northern Iowa Panthers football